Anna Maria Le Moine (born 30 October 1973 as Anna Bergström; also formerly known as Anna Svärd), is a Swedish curler. At the 2006 Winter Olympics in Turin, Italy, she was the lead for the Swedish team who won the gold-medal after a thrilling final game. She lives in Stockholm, and plays for Härnösands CK, Härnösand.
Le Moine starred, as well as her teammates, in the videoclip "Hearts on Fire" by the Swedish metal band HammerFall.

In 2004 she was inducted into the Swedish Curling Hall of Fame.

Teammates 
2006 Torino Olympic Games

Anette Norberg, Skip

Eva Lund, Third

Cathrine Lindahl, Second

Ulrika Bergman, Alternate

External links
 
 
 Official Website of the Swedish Curling Team
 "Hearts On Fire", Hammerfall

Living people
1973 births
Swedish female curlers
Olympic curlers of Sweden
Olympic gold medalists for Sweden
Curlers at the 2006 Winter Olympics
Curlers at the 2010 Winter Olympics
Olympic medalists in curling
Medalists at the 2010 Winter Olympics
Medalists at the 2006 Winter Olympics
World curling champions
European curling champions
Swedish curling champions
Continental Cup of Curling participants
People from Härjedalen Municipality